Sonomyn Luvsan (1912–1994) was a prominent Mongolian politician and diplomat who was acting Chairman of the Presidium of the People's Great Khural of the Mongolian People's Republic or MPR (titular head of state) from June 29, 1972 to June 11, 1974.

Career
Luvsan was Minister of Finance from 1940 to 1941. During World War II Luvsan served as deputy prime minister under Khorloogiin Choibalsan. On February 21, 1949, he was appointed Deputy Chairman of the Council of Ministers as well as Minister of Trade.

From 1957 to 1959 he served as Ambassador to the People's Republic of China. On June 17, 1959, he once again became Deputy Chairman of the Council of Ministers (deputy prime minister) before being appointed Ambassador to the USSR 1960 to 1964.

After his appointment to the Politburo of the MPRP Committee Committee in 1963, Luvsan became one of Mongolia's most powerful politicians and was often pictured at the side of Prime Minister and Secretary General of the Mongolian People's Revolutionary Party (MPRP) Yumjaagiin Tsedenbal.  Shortly after the death of the long-serving president Jamsrangiin Sambuu, Luvsan was removed from the post of First Vice Premier and elected to be First Vice-President and acting Chairmen of the Presidium of the People's Great Khural (titular head of state of the MPR) on June 29, 1972, replacing Tsagaanlamyn Dügersüren who was acting Chairman for one month. Prime Minister Tsedenbal had planned to ascend to the position himself after Sambuu's death, but political and health considerations caused him to delay this move. On June 11, 1974, Tsedenbal resigned his chairmanship of the Council of Ministers (prime minister) and upon Luvsan's enthusiastic endorsement was unanimously elected to the Chairmanship of the People's Great Khural, ending Luvsan's tenure as acting president.

Luvsan's son Luvsangiin Erdenechuluun (born 1948) is a prominent foreign policy adviser in Mongolia and served as foreign minister from 2000 to 2004.

References

External links
 Presidents of Mongolia

1994 deaths
1912 births
Communism in Mongolia
Mongolian communists
Presidents of Mongolia
Finance ministers of Mongolia
Ambassadors of Mongolia to the Soviet Union
Ambassadors of Mongolia to China